Thanh Niên (Vietnamese: Báo Thanh Niên "Young People's Newspaper") is a Ho Chi Minh City-based newspaper in Vietnam. It was the second most circulated newspaper in Vietnam in 2009, with an average circulation of 300,000. Thanh Niên News is released daily in Vietnamese language. Thanh Niên is an official organ of the Vietnam United Youth League (Hội Liên hiệp Thanh niên Việt Nam) and mainly focuses on social affairs, especially those that involve the youth. The newspaper announced the closure of its English language website, which was known as Thanh Niên News, on September 16, 2016, citing company reorganization.

Before its closure, the English edition went through several rebranding. It began as Thanh Niên Weekly and became Vietweek on January 6, 2012. When Vietweek ceased print publication, the name of the website, Thanh Niên News, took over.

References

External links

Defunct English language version

Communist newspapers
Newspapers published in Vietnam
Vietnamese-language newspapers
English-language newspapers published in Asia
Mass media in Ho Chi Minh City